The Vikings were a band from South Africa. Between 1959 and 1961 Manfred Mann and his childhood friend Saul Ozynski recorded two albums as the Vikings.

References

South African rock music groups